The Israeli ambassador in Moscow is the official representative of the Government of Israel to the Government of Russia.

When Gary Koren left in 2019, his deputy, Keren Cohen Gat, headed the embassy until Yacov Livne arrived on November 8 as temporary charge d’affaires.

List of representatives

References 

 
Russia
Israel